Phillips Pass is a pedestrian mountain pass located in the Teton Range in the U.S. state of Wyoming. The pass is along the crest of the range and the borders between Bridger-Teton National Forest to the east and Caribou-Targhee National Forest to the west. The pass is traversed by the Teton Crest Trail and can be accessed via  trails from Teton Pass to the southwest or the Phillips Canyon Trail to the east.

References

Mountain passes of Wyoming
Mountain passes of Teton County, Wyoming